The J-Bay Open 2014 was an event of the Association of Surfing Professionals for 2014 ASP World Tour.

This event was held from 10 to 21 July and contested by 36 surfers.

The tournament was won by Mick Fanning (AUS), who beat Joel Parkinson (AUS) in final.

Round 1

Round 2

Round 3

Round 4

Round 5

Quarter-finals

Semi-finals

Final

References
 Site ASP

J-Bay Open
2014 in surfing